1087 Arabis  is a stony Eoan asteroid from the outer regions of the asteroid belt, approximately 35 kilometers in diameter. It was iscovered by Karl Reinmuth at the Heidelberg Observatory in 1927 and assigned the provisional designation . The asteroid was named after the flowering plant Arabis (rockcress).

Discovery 

Arabis was officially discovered on 2 September 1927, by German astronomer Karl Reinmuth at the Heidelberg-Königstuhl State Observatory in southwest Germany. On the same night, it was independently discovered by Soviet-Russian astronomers Sergey Belyavsky and Nikolaj Ivanov at the Simeiz Observatory on the Crimean peninsula. The Minor Planet Center does not acknowledge these independent discoverers.

Orbit and classification 

Arabis is a member the Eos family, the largest asteroid family in the outer main belt consisting of nearly 10,000 known asteroids. It orbits the Sun at a distance of 2.7–3.3 AU once every 5 years and 3 months (1,911 days). Its orbit has an eccentricity of 0.09 and an inclination of 10° with respect to the ecliptic. The body's observation arc begins with its official discovery observation at Heidelberg.

Physical characteristics 

In the Tholen classification, Arabis is a common S-type asteroid.

Rotation period 

During the early 1990s, a rotational lightcurve was obtained in a photometric survey of small asteroids by European astronomers at the Chilean La Silla Observatory using the ESO 1-metre telescope. In November 2006, another lightcurve of Arabis was obtained by astronomers at the Oakley Observatory in Indiana, United States. Lightcurve analysis gave two well-defined rotation periods of 5.794 and 5.797 hours with a brightness variation of 0.14 and 0.40 magnitude, respectively.

Spin axis 

Between 2011 and 2017, an international collaboration modeled three lightcurves with a period of 5.794995, 5.79500 and 5.79501 hours, respectively. The more recent studies also determined two spin axis of (155.0°, 25.0°) and (331.0°, 5.0°) in ecliptic coordinates (λ, β).

Diameter and albedo 

According to the surveys carried out by the Infrared Astronomical Satellite IRAS, the Japanese Akari satellite and the NEOWISE mission of NASA's Wide-field Infrared Survey Explorer, Arabis measures between 31.75 and 47.98 kilometers in diameter and its surface has an albedo between 0.098 and 0.2248.

The Collaborative Asteroid Lightcurve Link derives an albedo of 0.2137 and a diameter of 31.67 kilometers based on an absolute magnitude of 9.79.

Naming 

This minor planet was named after the flowering plant Arabis (rockcress), a genus of herbs of the brassicaceae (known as the mustards, the crucifers, or the cabbage family). The official naming citation was mentioned in The Names of the Minor Planets by Paul Herget in 1955.

Reinmuth's flowers 

Due to his many discoveries, Karl Reinmuth submitted a large list of 66 newly named asteroids in the early 1930s. This list also contained a sequence of 28 asteroids, starting with 1054 Forsytia, that were all named after plants, in particular flowering plants (also see list of minor planets named after animals and plants).

Notes

References

External links 
 Asteroid Lightcurve Database (LCDB), query form (info )
 Dictionary of Minor Planet Names, Google books
 Asteroids and comets rotation curves, CdR – Observatoire de Genève, Raoul Behrend
 Discovery Circumstances: Numbered Minor Planets (1)-(5000) – Minor Planet Center
 
 

001087
Discoveries by Karl Wilhelm Reinmuth
Named minor planets
001087
19270902